Alfred Sawley was an English professional footballer who played as an inside forward. He played 13 matches and scored one goal in the Football League for Burnley.

References

English footballers
Association football forwards
Burnley F.C. players
Trawden Forest F.C. players
English Football League players
Year of death missing
Year of birth missing